The Espanola Paper Kings are a Canadian Junior "A" ice hockey team based out of Espanola, Ontario.  They are members of the Northern Ontario Junior Hockey League (NOJHL) and play their home games at the Espanola Regional Recreational Complex.

History
The Express were one of two expansion teams that entered the league prior to the start of the 2015–16 season. The team hired former NHL forward Tom McCarthy as its first head coach. McCarthy had previously coached the Espanola Rivermen prior to the teams disbandment. The team played its first game on September 11, 2015, losing at home 4-1 to the Rayside-Balfour Canadians before a crowd of 346. After losing the first six games in franchise history, the team picked up its first victory with a 3-2 win against the Blind River Beavers. Espanola made the playoffs in their first season just ahead of the Blind River Beavers. However, they fell to the Soo Eagles in a best-of-three series 2 games to 0. Espanola finished last in the league attendance wise, averaging only 181 fans per game.

In August 2016, coach McCarthy announced he was taking a head coaching position with HSC Csíkszereda in the Romanian Hockey League but would also remain involved with the Express as one of the owners. Co-coach Jason Rapcewicz took over as head coach. However, after one season, McCarthy returned to Espanola and the head coaching position. He left again after one season and was replaced by Dave Clancy from the Rayside-Balfour Canadians.

Prior to the 2019–20 season, Jason Rapcewicz became the sole owner of the team and took over as general manager from former owner Chad Clarke.

Season-by-season records

References

External links
Espanola Express webpage

Ice hockey teams in Ontario
Sport in Northern Ontario
2015 establishments in Ontario
Ice hockey clubs established in 2015